Litsea longifolia is a species of plant in the family Lauraceae. It is endemic to Sri Lanka. It is known as "rath keliya - රත් කෙලිය" in Sinhala.

References

longifolia
Endemic flora of Sri Lanka
Vulnerable flora of Asia
Taxonomy articles created by Polbot